The canton of Chauny is an administrative division in northern France. At the French canton reorganisation which came into effect in March 2015, the canton was expanded from 20 to 21 communes:
 
Abbécourt
Amigny-Rouy
Autreville
Beaumont-en-Beine
Béthancourt-en-Vaux
Caillouël-Crépigny
Caumont
Chauny
Commenchon
Condren
Frières-Faillouël
Guivry
Marest-Dampcourt
Neuflieux
La Neuville-en-Beine 
Ognes
Pierremande
Sinceny
Ugny-le-Gay
Villequier-Aumont
Viry-Noureuil

Demographics

See also
Cantons of the Aisne department 
Communes of France

References

Cantons of Aisne